Juan Riquelme (1616 – 22 Feb 1671) was a Roman Catholic prelate who served as Auxiliary Bishop of Seville (1668–1671).

Biography
Juan Riquelme was born in Seville, Spain.  On 17 Sep 1668, he was appointed during the papacy of Pope Clement IX as Auxiliary Bishop of Seville and Titular Bishop of Utica. He served as Auxiliary Bishop of Seville until his death on 22 Feb 1671.

References

External links and additional sources
 (for Chronology of Bishops) 
 (for Chronology of Bishops) 

1616 births
1671 deaths
17th-century Roman Catholic bishops in Spain
Bishops appointed by Pope Clement IX